Fuel Manager is a marine  fuel management system used to monitor and report fuel usage, with the aim of reducing vessel operator's fuel cost and the harmful emissions.  Fuel Manager is developed by Marorka in Iceland.  Fuel Manager was released in 2007.

Fuel Manager monitors the propulsion system on-board different types of vessels.  It puts operating and environmental parameters in an energy management context.  Fuel Manager uses a sophisticated measurement approach to deliver reliable fuel performance information to vessel operators.  

Energy conservation
Transport software